Children of the Dark Waters is the sixth studio album by Finnish symphonic death metal band Eternal Tears of Sorrow. It was released in May 2009 through Suomen Musiikki for Finland, Massacre Records for the rest of Europe and Marquee/Avalon Records for Asia. It is the second album to feature Jarmo Kylmänen on clean vocals, but his first album as an official member.

The album is in the same vein as Before the Bleeding Sun, but darker. "Angelheart, Ravenheart (Act II: Children of the Dark Waters)" is the second part of "Angelheart, Ravenheart (Act I: Before the Bleeding Sun)" from Before the Bleeding Sun. On the UK Amazon edition, "Vilda Mánnu" is replaced by "Sea of Whispers (Acoustic Reprise)" as a bonus track.

The album's first single was "Tears of Autumn Rain" released in Finland on 18 February and featured vocals by Miriam Renvåg (Ram-Zet) and Heidi Parviainen (Amberian Dawn). The B-side of the single is a reworked version of "Vilda Mánnu" from the self-titled album Vilda Mánnu. The album was mixed at Finnvox Studios (Helsinki) in March and April 2009 by Mikko Karmila, and like the previous five albums, it was recorded at Tico-Tico Studios in Kemi. Lead guitarist Risto Ruuth left the band right before the release of the album and was replaced by Mika Lammassaari (from Mors Subita).

Track listing

Charts

Personnel 
 Altti Veteläinen – lead vocals, bass guitar
 Jarmo Kylmänen – clean vocals/backing vocals
 Janne Tolsa – keyboards
 Jarmo Puolakanaho – rhythm guitar
 Risto Ruuth – lead guitar
 Juho Raappana – drums
 Petri Sankala – drums (on tracks 2, 3, 6 and 11) [1]*
[1]* Petri left the band after the first recording session.

Guest musicians 
 Miriam Elisabeth Renvåg – vocals (Ram-Zet)
 Heidi Parviainen – vocals (Amberian Dawn)

Release history

References 

2009 albums
Eternal Tears of Sorrow albums